Four from Planet 5 is a science fiction novel by Murray Leinster. It was released in 1959 by Fawcett Publications under their Gold Medal Books imprint reference number S937.  The novel details the arrival of a spaceship carrying four seemingly human children from an advanced civilisation close to a US scientific research base in Antarctica and the events that subsequently unfold. This story appeared in the September 1959 edition of Amazing Science Fiction under the title Long Ago Far Away.

Plot introduction
Soames is an underpaid researcher based at the Gissel Bay research station in Antarctica and is secretly in love with a visiting reporter, Gail Haynes. They and US W.A.C. Captain Moggs set out to investigate the arrival and crash landing of what appears to be a spaceship. Events soon unfold as the US government's attempts to hush up the alien landing are frustrated by the press.

External links
Paul Lehr Cover at ISFDB

1959 American novels
1959 science fiction novels
Novels by Murray Leinster
Novels about time travel
Novels about alien visitations
Fictional quartets
Child characters in literature
Gold Medal Books books